Scarborough is a British television sitcom set in the North Yorkshire seaside town of Scarborough, England. The series was aired on BBC One, and revolves around the lives of a group of friends who regularly meet up in a pub for karaoke on a Friday night.

The series was written and directed by Derren Litten, who wrote the award-winning ITV series, Benidorm.

The series was not recommissioned for a second series.

Synopsis
Mike and Karen are in their late 30s and are giving their romance another go after a break of five years. Mike always wanted to be an entertainer, a career that kept him away from home which led to the demise of their relationship. Mike, Karen, their friends and work colleagues, meet up on Friday nights to drink in the local pub and perform karaoke.

Cast
 Stephanie Cole as Marion Norris
 Catherine Tyldesley as Karen Norris
 Jason Manford as Mike
 Jake Canuso as Tony Peroni
 Rebekah Hinds as Yolanda 
 Steve Edge as Barry "Bigsy" Dixon
 Maggie Ollerenshaw as Geraldine Payne
 Harriet Webb as Lisa Marie 
 Gina Fillingham as Mandy
 Derren Litten as Jack 
 Claire Sweeney as Hayley Cox
 Steff Todd as Jess
 Rebecca Scroggs as WPC Treeves 
 Olisa Odele as PC Merrick
 Kenneth Cranham as Mr Ferris

Production
The show was announced by the BBC in August 2018. Filming started in the town of Scarborough in April 2019, with final scenes being filmed just over six weeks later at the end of May of the same year. Scenes have been filmed in Luna Park, Peasholm Park and the pub the Newcastle Packet Inn is shown in the series as being called The Good Ship where the characters meet up on Friday nights. Internal scenes at the pub were filmed in Sholver, Oldham. The hairdressing salon (Geraldine's), had its scenes filmed in Stockport, Greater Manchester, with most of the interior shots being filmed in studios in Manchester.

Episodes

Critical reception
The i and The Daily Mirror were not impressed with the opening episode; Sara Wallis wrote "This soap opera-style comedy was not my cup of Yorkshire. But let’s hope it warms up." Emily Baker, writing in The i, said "BBC One’s new comedy Scarborough is missing one key element – humour", continuing with "Scarborough’s complete lack of laughs is more frustrating than upsetting."

Michael Hogan, writing in The Daily Telegraph, was more positive about the start of the sitcom stating that whilst it was "not an unqualified success", but that it was "...a promising start." Of particular note for Hogan was Claire Sweeney as Hayley; "[Sweeney] hammed it up Dynasty-style as the local man-eater, all hairspray, leopardskin and cat-clawed one-liners (“I might be a slag and a home-wrecker but I’m very good at both”)." Likewise, in The Guardian, Graeme Virtue was in admiration of Sweeney's on-screen character, saying "...Sweeney brings some powerful energy as the local man-eater."

Notes

References

External links
 
 
 

2019 British television series debuts
2019 British television series endings
2010s British sitcoms
BBC television sitcoms
BBC high definition shows
English-language television shows
Television shows set in Yorkshire
Scarborough, North Yorkshire
Television series by BBC Studios